South Carolina elected its members October 13–14, 1806.

See also 
 South Carolina's 6th congressional district special election, 1807
 United States House of Representatives elections, 1806 and 1807
 List of United States representatives from South Carolina

1806
South Carolina
United States House of Representatives